Uvongo is a seaside resort in the KwaZulu-Natal South Coast at the mouth of the Vungu River in KwaZulu-Natal, South Africa. Uvongo is the largest upmarket residential area on the lower South Coast. The Vungu River has a waterfall that flows into a small gorge near the mouth. The town is named after the Vungu River, which is derived from the Zulu word that describes the sound of a waterfall or the wind in a gorge.

Uvongo beach lost its "Blue Flag" title due to storms damaging it in April 2007 but has managed to regain a clean and prestigious beach front. Uvongo still remains the playground of the rich, with multimillion rand properties in the area. Uvongo is one of South Africa's favourite holiday destinations and attracts local and foreign tourists.

Infrastructure

Roads 

Uvongo has access to one highway, the R61 freeway (future N2 Wild Coast Toll Route) which runs past Uvongo, bypassing the small town to the west. The freeway links the town to Port Shepstone and Durban in the north-east and Southbroom and Port Edward in the south-west. Access to Uvongo from the R61/N2 is obtained through the Seaslopes Avenue interchange (Exit 33), south of the area.

The R620 (Marine Drive) runs along the coast linking Uvongo to Shelly Beach and Port Shepstone in the north-east and Margate, Ramsgate, Southbroom and Port Edward (via the R61) in the south-west. The R620 can also be used as an alternative route to Shelly Beach, Port Shepstone, Durban and Kokstad  (via the R102 in Port Shepstone) for motorists avoiding the Izotsha Ramp Plaza in Shelly Beach and the Oribi Toll Plaza in Port Shepstone.

'Seaslopes Avenue'/'Wingate Avenue' is a small secondary road which starts at the intersection with the R620, between Uvongo and Manaba Beach links Uvongo to the R61/N2, Margate Country Club and the Gayridge agricultural holdings in the south-west.

See also
Black December
St Michael's-on-Sea
KwaZulu-Natal South Coast

References

Populated places in the Ray Nkonyeni Local Municipality
Populated coastal places in South Africa
KwaZulu-Natal South Coast